The 1998–99 Scottish Inter-District Championship was a rugby union competition for Scotland's professional district teams. With the merging of the 4 districts into 2; now only Glasgow and Edinburgh were involved in the Scottish Inter-District Championship. Glasgow Caledonians and Edinburgh Reivers then fought it out in a renamed Tri-Series sponsored by Tennents Velvet.

Three matches were played between the clubs. Edinburgh won the series, beating Glasgow 2-1. A league table is shown for completeness. Both teams entered the next year's Heineken Cup.

1998-99 League Table

Results

Round 1

Round 2

Round 3

1998–99 in Scottish rugby union
1998–99
Scot